Field Marshal Studholme Hodgson (1708 – 20 October 1798) was a British Army officer who served during the 18th century. After serving as an Aide-de-Camp to the Duke of Cumberland  at the Battle of Fontenoy  during the War of the Austrian Succession and at the Battle of Culloden during the Jacobite Rebellion, he became correspondent to William Barrington, the Secretary at War, during the French and Indian War. He went on to command the British expedition which captured Belle Île in June 1761 during the Seven Years' War so enabling the British Government to use the island as a bargaining piece during the negotiations leading up to the Treaty of Paris in 1763.

Military career
Born the son of John Hodgson, a merchant from Carlisle, and educated at Carlisle Grammar School, Hodgson was commissioned as an ensign in the 1st Regiment of Foot Guards and lieutenant in the Army on 2 January 1728. He was promoted to captain in his regiment and lieutenant in the Army on 3 February 1741.

Hodgson was appointed Aide-de-Camp to the Duke of Cumberland in early 1745 and fought under Cumberland at the Battle of Fontenoy in May 1745 during the War of the Austrian Succession. He also fought under Cumberland at the Battle of Culloden in April 1746 during the Jacobite Rebellion. Promoted to captain in his regiment and lieutenant colonel in the Army on 18 May 1747, he became correspondent to William Barrington, the Secretary at War, in 1755 during the French and Indian War.

Hodgson raised a new regiment (later the 50th Regiment of Foot) in 1756 and served under Sir John Mordaunt, as a brigade commander, during the unsuccessful Raid on Rochefort in September 1757 during the Seven Years' War. Promoted to major-general on 15 September 1759, he became colonel of the 5th Regiment of Foot in October 1759.

Hodgson led a British raid on Belle Île, off the coast of France. After the initial British attack was repulsed a second attempt forced a beachhead. A second landing was made and, after a six-week siege, the island's main citadel at Le Palais was stormed, consolidating British control of the island in June 1761. He was much congratulated by both the King and William Pitt, Secretary of State for the Southern Department, as this "important and critical operation" enabled the British Government to use Belle Île as a bargaining piece during the negotiations leading up to the Treaty of Paris in 1763. Promoted to lieutenant general on 23 March 1765, he became Governor of Fort George and Fort Augustus in September 1765.

Hodgson became colonel of the 4th Regiment of Foot in November 1768 and, having been promoted to full general on 2 April 1778, he became colonel of the 7th Dragoon Guards in June 1782 and colonel of the 11th Light Dragoons in March 1789.

Hodgson was promoted to field marshal on 30 July 1796. He died at his home in Old Burlington Street in London on 20 October 1798 and was buried at St James's Church, Piccadilly on 26 October 1798.

Family

In July 1756 Hodgson married Catherine Howard, sister of Field Marshal Sir George Howard; they had three sons and two daughters, including John Hodgson (b. 16 March 1759).

References

Sources

1708 births
1798 deaths
11th Hussars officers
British field marshals
British Army personnel of the Jacobite rising of 1745
British Army personnel of the Seven Years' War
Grenadier Guards officers
Royal Northumberland Fusiliers officers
King's Own Royal Regiment officers
7th Dragoon Guards officers
People educated at Carlisle Grammar School
Burials at St James's Church, Piccadilly